Sarah Elizabeth Ruden is an American writer of poetry, essays, translations of Classic literature, and popularizations of Biblical philology, religious criticism and interpretation.

Early life
Sarah Ruden was born in Ohio in 1962 and raised in the United Methodist Church. She holds an M.A. from the Johns Hopkins Writing Seminars and a Ph.D. in Classical Philology from Harvard University.

In addition to her academic appointments, Ruden has worked as a medical editor, a contributor to American periodicals, and a stringer for the South African investigative magazine noseweek.

Ruden became an activist Quaker during her ten years spent in post-apartheid South Africa, where she was a tutor for the South African Education and Environment Project. Both before and after her return to the United States in 2005, Ruden has engaged in ecumenical outreach and published a number of articles and essays, mainly in conservative publications.

Career
She was a lecturer in Classics at the University of Cape Town. In 2016, she was awarded a Whiting Creative Nonfiction Grant to complete her translation of The Confessions of Augustine (2017).

She is a vocal advocate for the popularization of ancient texts.

Ruden has been a visiting scholar at the University of Pennsylvania since 2018.

Awards 
In 2010, Ruden was awarded a Guggenheim Fellowship to fund her translation of the Oresteia of Aeschylus. She won a Whiting Creative Nonfiction Grant to complete her translation of The Confessions of Augustine in 2016. Her translation of the Gospels was funded in part by a Robert B. Silvers Grant for Work in Progress in 2019.

Personal life
Ruden has been a “convinced Friend,” or Quaker convert, since 1992. Her Quakerism informs her translation methodology.

Books

Poetry
  (Awarded the 1996 Central News Agency Literary Award)

Translations
 
 
 
  Revised and expanded (Yale Univ. Press, 2021).
 
Aeschylus (2016). The Oresteia, in The Greek Plays (ed. Mary Lefkowitz and James Romm). Modern Library.
 
Plato (2015). Hippias Minor or The Art of Cunning: A new translation of Plato’s most controversial dialogue (trans.). With introduction and artwork by Paul Chan; essay by Richard Fletcher. Badlands Unlimited and the DESTE Foundation for Contemporary Art.
Anonymous (2021). The Gospels (trans.) Modern Library.

Biblical interpretation

References 

American Quakers
American women poets
American classical scholars
Women classical scholars
21st-century American poets
Harvard University alumni
Johns Hopkins University alumni
Living people
1962 births
American Christian writers
Translators of the Bible into English
University of Michigan alumni
American women non-fiction writers
21st-century American non-fiction writers
21st-century American women writers
Translators of Virgil
20th-century American poets
20th-century American women writers
20th-century translators
21st-century translators
Female Bible Translators
20th-century Quakers
21st-century Quakers
Quaker writers